Thomas Sydney Griffin (19 February 1884 – 19 December 1950) was an Australian rugby union player who competed in the 1908 Summer Olympics.

Griffin, a hooker, was born in Sydney, New South Wales and claimed a total of six international rugby caps for Australia.

See also
 Rugby union at the 1908 Summer Olympics
 1912 Australia rugby union tour of Canada and the U.S.

References

External links
 
 

1884 births
1950 deaths
Australian rugby union players
Australia international rugby union players
Rugby union players at the 1908 Summer Olympics
Olympic rugby union players of Australasia
Olympic gold medalists for Australasia
Medalists at the 1908 Summer Olympics
Rugby union players from Sydney
Rugby union hookers